Abdullah Ali is a Bahraini sports shooter. He competed in the men's 50 metre rifle, prone event at the 1984 Summer Olympics.

References

External links

Year of birth missing (living people)
Living people
Bahraini male sport shooters
Olympic shooters of Bahrain
Shooters at the 1984 Summer Olympics
Place of birth missing (living people)